Tubuliporidae is a family of bryozoans belonging to the order Cyclostomatida.

Genera

Genera:
 Bathysoecia Osburn, 1953
 Biovicella Mongereau, 1970
 Buglovella Ponomareva, 1975

References

Bryozoan families